John Anderson Jr. (May 8, 1917 – September 15, 2014) was an American politician who served as the 36th governor of Kansas, from 1961 until 1965. A member of the Republican Party, he previously was the 33rd attorney general of Kansas from 1956 until 1961.

Life and career
Anderson was born near Olathe, Kansas, to John and Ora Bookout Anderson. He graduated from Olathe High School in 1935. From there he went on to Kansas State College of Agriculture and Applied Science, and later transferred to the University of Kansas. In 1943 he graduated from the University of Kansas, and from the University of Kansas Law School the following year. He did not qualify for military service during World War II for physical reasons. Instead, he spent two years, from 1944 to 1946, on the staff of Federal Judge Walter A. Huxman. Later in 1946, Anderson opened his own law practice in Olathe.

Soon after establishing his law practice, Anderson entered politics by running for county attorney of Johnson County as a Republican. Anderson won this election, as well as two following elections and served in this capacity until 1953.

Beginning in 1952, Anderson sought to elevate his political career by running for a seat in the Kansas State Senate. Again he was successful, holding his office until March 1, 1956. At that time, he was appointed to fill the unexpired term as attorney general. Once in this elective office, Anderson won the two following elections in 1956 and 1958.

By 1960, Anderson was ready for bigger ambitions and entered the race for the office of governor in the election of that year. He defeated the Democratic incumbent, George Docking, 511,534 to 402,261 (the Prohibition candidate received 8,727). In keeping with his tradition for winning elections in pairs, Anderson also won the 1962 Gubernatorial election. Anderson became the first governor of Kansas to occupy Cedar Crest which had just been renovated at a cost of one hundred thousand dollars.

In 1964, Anderson chose not to seek re-election, but instead, went back to his law practice in Olathe. He remained active in public service after leaving the governor's office, serving as an attorney for the Board of Healing Arts and the Kansas Turnpike Authority. In addition, he served as the director of the Citizens' Conference on State Legislatures from 1965 to 1972. He was nominated for federal judgeships on a number of occasions, but was never appointed. Again, in 1972 he tried for the Republican Party nomination for governor, but was defeated by Morris Kay.

After leaving the Governor's office, Anderson retired to his native Olathe.

Anderson died September 15, 2014, at the age of 97.

Legacy
K-10 in Johnson County, Kansas, is named in Anderson's honor.

Notes

External links
 Publications concerning Kansas Governor Anderson's administration available via the KGI Online Library

|-

|-

|-

1917 births
2014 deaths
Republican Party governors of Kansas
Kansas Attorneys General
Republican Party Kansas state senators
Kansas State University alumni
Politicians from Olathe, Kansas
University of Kansas School of Law alumni
20th-century American politicians